The Brutos Application Framework is MVC controller written in Java. Designed to reduce the complexity of 
web development, with configurable mapping, view resolution as well as support for uploading and downloading files. 
Can be configured using XML, annotations and CoC.

The framework follows the below principles:
 flexibility;
 loose coupling and
 productivity.

Release bundle downloads
The Brutos team provides release bundles hosted on the SourceForge File Release System, in ZIP. 

Each release bundle contains JARs, documentation, source code, and other information.

Maven repository artifacts
They are produced a number of artifacts. All under the org.brandao directory.

 brutos-core: The main artifact, it is needed to build applications using the Brutos native APIs.
 brutos-annotation: Optional artifact that allows building applications using annotations. This artifact depends on the brutos-core.
 brutos-web: Optional artifact that allows building web applications. This artifact depends on the brutos-core.

How to configure?

Register the listener in web.xml

<listener>
    <listener-class>org.brandao.brutos.web.ContextLoaderListener</listener-class>
</listener>

Register the filter in web.xml

<filter>
        <filter-name>Brutos Framework Filter</filter-name>
        <filter-class>org.brandao.brutos.web.http.BrutosRequestFilter</filter-class>
    </filter>
    <filter-mapping>
        <filter-name>Brutos Framework Filter</filter-name>
        <url-pattern>*</url-pattern>
        <dispatcher>REQUEST</dispatcher>
        <dispatcher>FORWARD</dispatcher>
        <dispatcher>INCLUDE</dispatcher>
        <dispatcher>ERROR</dispatcher>
    </filter-mapping>
</filter>

Attention: If you are using a container that supports the Servlet 3.0 specification, the registration of ContextLoadListener and DispatcherServlet or BrutosRequestFilter are not necessary. They will be automatically registered.

Register the artifacts in pom.xml

...
<dependencies>
  <dependency>
      <groupId>org.brandao</groupId>
      <artifactId>brutos-core</artifactId>
      <version>2.0-rc3</version>
  </dependency>
  <dependency>
     <groupId>org.brandao</groupId>
     <artifactId>brutos-web</artifactId>
     <version>2.0-rc3</version>
  </dependency>
  <dependency>
     <groupId>org.brandao</groupId>
     <artifactId>brutos-annotation</artifactId>
     <version>2.0-rc3</version>
  </dependency>
</dependencies>
...

Create the file brutos-config.xml in /WEB-INF.

<?xml version="1.0" encoding="UTF-8"?>
<controllers  xmlns:xsi='http://www.w3.org/2001/XMLSchema-instance'
              xmlns='http://www.brutosframework.com.br/schema/controllers'
              xmlns:context='http://www.brutosframework.com.br/schema/context'
              xsi:schemaLocation='
   http://www.brutosframework.com.br/schema/controllers 
http://www.brutosframework.com.br/schema/controllers/brutos-controllers-1.1.xsd
   http://www.brutosframework.com.br/schema/context 
http://www.brutosframework.com.br/schema/context/brutos-context-1.1.xsd
   http://www.brutosframework.com.br/schema/web http://www.brutosframework.com.br/schema/web/brutos-web-1.1.xsd'>

</controllers>

Examples

Web Service

Methods:

Controller:

@Controller
@AcceptRequestType(MediaTypes.APPLICATION_JSON)
@ResponseType(MediaTypes.APPLICATION_JSON)
@ResponseError(code=HttpStatus.NOT_FOUND, target=NotFoundException.class)
public class UserWebService {

    @Inject
    private UserService userService;

    @Action("/users")
    public List<User> list() {
        return this.userService.list();
    }

    @Action("/users")
    @RequestMethod(RequestMethodTypes.POST)
    @ResponseStatus(HttpStatus.CREATED)
    public void add(User user) {
        this.userService.save(user);
    }

    @Action("/users/{user.id}")
    @RequestMethod(RequestMethodTypes.PUT)
    @ResponseStatus(HttpStatus.NO_CONTENT)
    public void update(User user) throws NotFoundException {
        if (user == null) {
            throw new NotFoundException();
        }
        this.userService.update(user);
    }

    @Action("/users/{id}")
    @RequestMethod(RequestMethodTypes.DELETE)
    @ResponseStatus(HttpStatus.NO_CONTENT)
    public void delete(Integer id) throws NotFoundException {

        User e = this.userService.remove(id);

        if (e == null) {
            throw new NotFoundException();
        }
    }
}

Exception Handler

Controller Level

@ResponseError(value=HttpStatus.CONFLICT, 
               reason="Data integrity violation", target=DataIntegrityViolationException.class)
public class ExampleController {
  
   @Action("/action")
   public void action() throws DataIntegrityViolationException{
       ...
   }

}

Action Level

public class ExampleController{
  
   @Action("/action")
   @ResponseError(value=HttpStatus.CONFLICT, 
            reason="Data integrity violation", target=DataIntegrityViolationException.class)
   public void action() throws DataIntegrityViolationException{
       ...
   }

}

Method

public class ExampleController{
  
   @Action("/action")
   public void action() throws MyBadDataException {
       ...
   }

   @ResponseError(MyBadDataException.class)
   public WebActionResult myBadDataException(Throwable exception, WebActionResult result) {
       result
           .setResponseStatus(HttpStatus.BAD_REQUEST)
           .setView("errorView")
           .add("exception", exception);
       return result;
   }

}

Build Action Result

Controller
public class IndexController {
  
   public WebResultAction action1Action(WebResultAction result) {
      result.addHeader("Content-Type", "text/html; charset=utf-8")
            .setContentType(String.class)
            .setContent("<html><body>test</body></html>");
      return result;
   }

    public WebResultAction action2Action (WebResultAction result) {
        result.addHeader("Content-Type", "text/html; charset=utf-8")
            .setView("myView")
            .add("value1", BigDecimal.ONE);
        return result;
    }

}

Polymorphic Mapping

Methods:

Controller
public class ExampleController{

    @Action("/add")
    @RequestMethod(RequestMethodTypes.POST)
    public void add(
        @Any(
            metaBean=@Basic(bean="type")
            metaValues={
                @MetaValue(name="apple", target=Apple.class),
                @MetaValue(name="orange", target=Orange.class)
            }
        )
        Fruit fruit) {
            ...
    }
}

Beans
public abstract class Fruit {
    ...
}

public class Apple extends Fruit {
   ...
}

public class Orange extends Fruit {
   ...
}

Abstract action

URI mapping:

Controller
@Controller("/path", defaultAction="/")
@Action(value="/", view=@View("view"))
public class ExampleController{

}

Using URI template

URI mapping:

Controller
@Controller("/path/{userId}")
public class ExampleController{

    @Action("/showUser")
    public User getUser(String userId) {
        ...
    }

}

File upload and download

@Controller("/files")
public class ExampleController {
  
    @Action("/")
    @RequestMethod(RequestMethodTypes.POST)
    public void uploadAction(File file) {
         //the parameter file is a temporary file
         ...
    }

    @Action("/{fileName:.*}")
    @RequestMethod(RequestMethodTypes.GET)
    public File downloadAction(String fileName) {
        File file = ...;
        return file;
    }

}

Form and Session

public class PersonController{

    @Action("/save")
    public void saveAction(
        @Basic(scope="session") User loggerdUser, @Basic(bean="person") Person person) {
        ...
    }

}

See also
 Model–view–controller (MVC)
 Inversion of control
 Web framework
 Comparison of web frameworks

External links
Official website
Source Code
Mailing Lists
Examples

Book
Brutos Framework 2

Java enterprise platform
Web frameworks
Cross-platform software
Free software programmed in Java (programming language)
Software using the Apache license
Articles with example Java code